2009 in sports describes the world events in sport.

Alpine skiing
 Alpine World Ski Championships 2009 held at Val d'Isère, Savoy, France

American football
 Super Bowl XLIII – the Pittsburgh Steelers (AFC) won 27–23 over the Arizona Cardinals (NFC)
Location: Raymond James Stadium
Attendance: 70,774
MVP: Santonio Holmes, WR (Pittsburgh)
 BCS National Championship Game at Orange Bowl (2008 season):
 The Florida Gators won 24-14 over the Oklahoma Sooners in front of a record crowd of 78,468 to win the BCS National Championship
 September 20 – The Dallas Cowboys play their first game in the new Cowboys Stadium against the New York Giants and lose 31–33.  The game drew an NFL record regular-season crowd of over 105,000.
 September 27 – Detroit Lions defeat the Washington Redskins to end a 19-game losing streak dating back to December 2007.  This tied the 1942–45 Chicago Cardinals (who suspended independent operations in 1944) and the 1961–62 Oakland Raiders for the second longest such streak after the 1976–77 Tampa Bay Buccaneers.
 October 8 – The United Football League made its debut.
 November 27 – In the first UFL Championship Game, the Las Vegas Locomotives defeat the previously unbeaten Florida Tuskers 20–17 in overtime.

Association football

 Shakhtar Donetsk win the UEFA Cup after beating Werder Bremen 2–1 in extra time of the 2009 UEFA Cup Final in Istanbul.
 FC Barcelona win the UEFA Champions League after beating Manchester United 2–0 in the 2009 UEFA Champions League Final in Rome.
 Estudiantes win the Copa Libertadores after beating Cruzeiro 4–1 on points.
  win the 2009 FIFA Confederations Cup after beating the  3–2 in the final in Johannesburg, South Africa.
  win the 2009 CONCACAF Gold Cup after beating the  5–0 in the final in East Rutherford, United States.
  win the 2009 FIFA U-20 World Cup after beating  4–3 in penalties (the match ended 0–0) in the final in Cairo, Egypt.
  win the 2009 FIFA U-17 World Cup after beating  1–0 in the final in Abuja, Nigeria.
 FC Barcelona win the 2009 FIFA Club World Cup after beating Estudiantes de La Plata 2–1 in the final in Abu Dhabi, United Arab Emirates.
 Liga Deportiva Universitaria de Quito win the Recopa Sudamericana after defeating Internacional in the two-legged final.
 Liga Deportiva Universitaria de Quito win the Copa Sudamericana after defeating Fluminense FC in the two-legged final.
 FIFA World Player of the Year:
 Men: Lionel Messi,  and FC Barcelona
 Women: Marta,  and Los Angeles Sol
 Marta becomes the first four-time winner of the award of either sex, with all of her awards consecutive.

Athletics

 2009 World Championships in Athletics at Olympiastadion, Berlin

Australian Rules Football
 Australian Football League
 July 11 –  kick the lowest score since 1961 when they score only 1.7 (13) against ’s 19.16 (130)
 September 26 – 2009 AFL Grand Final in Melbourne, Australia, is won by the Geelong Football Club against the St Kilda Football Club on by 12 points.

Bandy

 2009 Bandy World Championship in Västerås, Sweden, is won by the host nation after defeating Russia in the final

Baseball

   Japan win the 2009 World Baseball Classic after beating  South Korea by 5–3 (F/10) in the final at Dodger Stadium, Los Angeles, California.
 New York City opens two new ballparks, The New Yankee Stadium for the New York Yankees and Citi Field for the New York Mets.
 Mark Buehrle of the Chicago White Sox throws the 18th perfect game in Major League history against the Tampa Bay Rays.
 The New York Yankees defeat the Philadelphia Phillies 4 games to 2 to win their 27th World Series championship. Hideki Matsui is named World Series MVP
 The Yomiuri Giants defeat the Hokkaido Nippon-Ham Fighters 4 games to 2 to win their 21st Japan Series championship. The Giants' Shinnosuke Abe is named MVP.

Basketball

 NCAA men's tournament — North Carolina defeats Michigan State 89–72 at Ford Field in Detroit. It is North Carolina's fifth national title.
 NBA Finals — The Los Angeles Lakers defeat the Orlando Magic 4 games to 1 to win the 2009 NBA Championship. The Lakers' Kobe Bryant is named Finals MVP.
 Euroleague — Panathinaikos win their fifth Euroleague crown, defeating defending champions CSKA Moscow 73–71 in the final in Berlin.
 NCAA women's tournament — Connecticut completes a 39–0 season with a 76–54 win over Louisville at the Scottrade Center in St. Louis. It is the sixth national title and third unbeaten season for the Huskies.

Boxing
 2009 World Amateur Boxing Championships held in Mediolanum Forum, Milan
 David Haye defeats Nikolai Valuev to claim the WBA World heavyweight title.
 Vitali Klitchko comes back from injury
 Manny Pacquiao defeated Ricky Hatton to win the IBO and Ring Magazine Light Welterweight championship. Pacquiao also defeated Miguel Cotto to win the WBO Welterweight championship to become the first boxer to win 7 world title in seven different weight classes.
 Floyd Mayweather Jr. came out of retirement by facing lightweight champion Juan Manuel Marquez and defeating him by unanimous decision.

Canadian football
 97th Grey Cup game at McMahon Stadium in Calgary – Montreal Alouettes defeat Saskatchewan Roughriders 28–27. Avon Cobourne was named MVP

Cricket

 March 3 – five members of the Sri Lanka national cricket team are injured when their team bus is attacked by masked gunmen en route to the third day's play of their Second Test against Pakistan at Lahore. The tour is cancelled following the attack.
 March 7–22 – 2009 Women's Cricket World Cup held in Australia.
 Deccan Chargers win the 2009 Indian Premier League held in South Africa.
 June 5,  – June 21, – 2009 ICC World Twenty20 held in England.
 September 22,  – October 5, – 2009 ICC Champions Trophy held in South Africa

Cycling
 Giro d'Italia – Denis Menchov
 Tour de France – Alberto Contador
 Vuelta a España – Alejandro Valverde
 2009 UCI Road World Championships - Men's Road Race – Cadel Evans
 2009 UCI Road World Championships – Men's Time Trial – Fabian Cancellara
 2009 UCI Road World Championships - Women's Road Race – Tatiana Guderzo
 2009 UCI Road World Championships – Women's Time Trial – Kristin Armstrong

Floorball
 Women's World Floorball Championships
 Champion: 
 Men's under-19 World Floorball Championships
 Champion: 
 EuroFloorball Cup
 Men's champion:  SSV Helsinki
 Women's champion:  IKSU Innebandy

Golf

Major championships
The Masters winner: Ángel Cabrera
U.S. Open winner: Lucas Glover
The Open Championship winner: Stewart Cink
PGA Championship winner: Yang Yong-eun

Women's major championships
Kraft Nabisco Championship winner: Brittany Lincicome
LPGA Championship winner: Anna Nordqvist
U.S. Women's Open winner: Ji Eun-hee
Women's British Open winner: Catriona Matthew

Senior major championships
Senior PGA Championship winner: Michael Allen
Senior British Open winner: Loren Roberts
U.S. Senior Open winner: Fred Funk
The Tradition winner: Mike Reid
Senior Players Championship winner: Jay Haas

Gymnastics
 2009 World Artistic Gymnastics Championships
 2009 World Rhythmic Gymnastics Championships

Handball
 2009 World Men's Handball Championship – France defeats Croatia 24–19 in the final

Horse racing
Steeplechases
 Cheltenham Gold Cup – Kauto Star
 Grand National – Mon Mome
Flat races
 Australia: Melbourne Cup – Shocking
 Canadian Triple Crown:
 Queen's Plate – Eye of the Leopard
 Prince of Wales Stakes – Gallant
 Breeders' Stakes – Purple Shower
 Dubai: Dubai World Cup – Well Armed
 France: Prix de l'Arc de Triomphe – Sea the Stars
 Ireland: Irish Derby Stakes – Fame and Glory
 Japan: Japan Cup – Vodka
 English Triple Crown:
 2,000 Guineas Stakes – Sea the Stars
 The Derby – Sea the Stars
 St. Leger Stakes – Mastery
 United States Triple Crown:
 Kentucky Derby – Mine That Bird
 Preakness Stakes – Rachel Alexandra
 Belmont Stakes – Summer Bird
 Breeders' Cup World Thoroughbred Championships at Santa Anita Park, Arcadia, California (all races in order of running):
 Day 1 (November 6):
 Breeders' Cup Marathon – Man of Iron
 Breeders' Cup Juvenile Fillies Turf – Tapitsfly
 Breeders' Cup Juvenile Fillies – She Be Wild
 Breeders' Cup Filly & Mare Turf – Midday
 Breeders' Cup Filly & Mare Sprint – Informed Decision
 Breeders' Cup Ladies' Classic – Life Is Sweet
 Day 2 (November 7):
 Breeders' Cup Juvenile Turf – Pounced
 Breeders' Cup Turf Sprint – California Flag
 Breeders' Cup Sprint – Dancing in Silks
 Breeders' Cup Juvenile – Vale of York
 Breeders' Cup Mile – Goldikova
 Breeders' Cup Dirt Mile – Furthest Land
 Breeders' Cup Turf – Conduit
 Breeders' Cup Classic – Zenyatta

Ice hockey

 April 18 – Bentley Generals win 2009 Allan Cup Canadian senior championship.
 April 19 – Ak Bars Kazan win 2009 Gagarin Cup.
 May 10 –  defeats  2–1 to win the 2009 IIHF World Championship.
 May 24 – Windsor Spitfires win 2009 Memorial Cup Canadian junior championship.
 June 12 – Pittsburgh Penguins defeat the Detroit Red Wings to win the 2009 Stanley Cup. Evgeni Malkin is awarded the Conn Smythe Trophy.
 June 26–27 – 2009 NHL Entry Draft held in Montreal.
 September 29 – ZSC Lions defeat the Chicago Blackhawks to win the 2009 Victoria Cup.

Mixed martial arts
The following is a list of major noteworthy MMA events by month.

January

1/14 – World Victory Road Presents: Sengoku no Ran 2009

1/17 – UFC 93: Franklin vs. Henderson

1/24 – Affliction: Day of Reckoning

1/25 – WEC 38: Varner vs. Cerrone

1/31 – UFC 94: St-Pierre vs. Penn 2

February

2/7 – UFC Fight Night: Lauzon vs. Stephens

2/21 – UFC 95: Sanchez vs. Stevenson

March

3/1 – WEC 39: Brown vs. Garcia

3/7 – UFC 96: Jackson vs. Jardine

3/8 – DREAM.7

3/20 – World Victory Road Presents: Sengoku 7

April

4/1 – UFC Fight Night: Condit vs. Kampmann

4/3 – Bellator I

4/5 – WEC 40: Torres vs. Mizugaki

4/5 – DREAM.8

4/10 – Bellator II

4/11 – Strikeforce: Shamrock vs. Diaz

4/17 – Bellator III

4/17 – Bellator IV

4/18 – UFC 97: Redemption

May

5/1 – Bellator V

5/2 – World Victory Road Presents: Sengoku 8

5/8 – Bellator VI

5/15 – ShoMMA 1: Evangelista vs. Aina

5/15 – Bellator VII

5/15 – MFC 21: Hard Knocks

5/23 – UFC 98: Evans vs. Machida

5/26 – DREAM.9

5/29 – Bellator IX

June

6/5 – Bellator X

6/6 – Strikeforce: Lawler vs. Shields

6/7 – WEC 41: Brown vs. Faber II

6/12 – Bellator XI

6/13 – UFC 99: The Comeback

6/19 – ShoMMA 2: Villasenor vs. Cyborg

6/19 – Bellator XII

6/20 – The Ultimate Fighter: United States vs. United Kingdom Finale

July

7/11 – UFC 100

7/20 – DREAM.10

8/2 – World Victory Road Presents: Sengoku 9

8/8 – UFC 101: Declaration

8/9 – WEC 42: Torres vs. Bowles

8/15 – Strikeforce: Carano vs. Cyborg

8/29 – UFC 102: Couture vs. Nogueira

September

9/16 – UFC Fight Night: Diaz vs. Guillard

9/19 – UFC 103: Franklin vs. Belfort

9/23 – World Victory Road Presents: Sengoku 10

9/25 – ShoMMA 3: Kennedy vs. Cummings

October

10/6 – DREAM.11

10/10 – WEC 43: Cerrone vs. Henderson

10/24 – UFC 104: Machida vs. Shogun

10/25 – DREAM.12

November

11/6 – ShoMMA 4: Gurgel vs. Evangelista

11/7 – Strikeforce: Fedor vs. Rogers

11/7 – World Victory Road Presents: Sengoku 11

11/14 – UFC 105: Couture vs. Vera

11/18 – WEC 44: Brown vs. Aldo

11/20 – ShoMMA 5: Woodley vs. Bears

11/21 – UFC 106: Ortiz vs. Griffin 2

December

12/5 – The Ultimate Fighter: Heavyweights Finale

12/12 – UFC 107: Penn vs. Sanchez

12/19 – WEC 45: Cerrone vs. Ratcliff

12/19 – Strikeforce: Evolution

12/31 – Dynamite!! 2009

Motorsport

Netball
 ANZ Championship — Melbourne Vixens def. Adelaide Thunderbirds by 54–46 to win the 2009 season.
 World Youth Netball Championships —  U21 def.  U21 to win 2009 WYNC in the Cook Islands.
 World Netball Series (inaugural) —  def.  by 32–27 to win the 2009 Series in Manchester, England.

Pickleball
 November 2–8: The first United States national pickleball championships are held in Surprise, Arizona.

Rink hockey
 Spain wins the 2009 Rink Hockey World Championship, defeating Argentina in the final.

Rowing
 2009 World Rowing Championships regatta will be held at Lake Malta, Poznań, Poland

Rugby league

 March 1 – Manly-Warringah Sea Eagles defeats Leeds Rhinos 28–20 to win the 2009 World Club Challenge at Elland Road
March 22: Maesteg, South Wales – 20-year-old forward Leon Walker collapses and dies on the field in a reserve match between Wakefield Trinity Wildcats and Celtic Crusaders.
 June–July – Queensland defeats New South Wales 2–1 in the 2009 State of Origin series to claim a record 4th straight Origin series victory.
 August 29 – Warrington Wolves defeats Huddersfield Giants 25 – 16 to win The Carnegie Challenge Cup at Wembley
 October 4 – Melbourne Storm defeat Parramatta Eels 23–16 in the 2009 NRL Grand Final to win their third premiership and second in two years. Billy Slater named Clive Churchill Medalist. On April 22, 2010, the Melbourne Storm were stripped of the 2007 and 2009 premierships and the 2006–2008 minor premierships, after Storm officials confessed to the NRL that the club had committed serious and systematic breaches of the salary cap between 2006 and 2010 by running a well-organized dual contract and bookkeeping system which concealed a total of $3.17 million in payments made to players outside of the salary cap.
 November – Australia defeat England 46–16 in the final of the Rugby League Four Nations tournament in England.

Rugby union

 115th Six Nations Championship series is won by  who complete the Grand Slam
 2009 Rugby World Cup Sevens
  win the men's competition.
 The inaugural women's competition is won by  Australia.
 2008–09 IRB Sevens World Series – 
 July 18 – The Celtic League and Italian Rugby Federation tentatively agree that two Italian teams will enter the previously Celtic league in 2010–11.
 September 14 – SANZAR, the organiser of the Tri Nations and Super 14 competitions, announces that  has been provisionally invited to join an expanded "Four Nations" competition effective in 2012.
 November 12 – Independent arbitrators appointed by SANZAR award the 15th Super Rugby franchise to Melbourne, specifically to the operators of the Melbourne Rebels, the city's representative in the defunct Australian Rugby Championship. The new team, whose name was ultimately announced as the Rebels, will join an expanded Super 15 in 2011.
 2009 British & Irish Lions tour to South Africa – South Africa wins the Test series 2–1
 Tri Nations –

Ski jumping
 January 6 – Wolfgang Loitzl wins the Four Hills Tournament

Speed skating
 Czech female skater Martina Sáblíková and Dutch male skater Sven Kramer win the 2009 World Allround Speed Skating Championships in Hamar

Swimming
 2009 World Aquatics Championships held at Rome

Tennis
Australian Open
Men's final: Rafael Nadal defeats Roger Federer, 7–5, 3–6, 7–6(3), 3–6, 6–2
Women's final: Serena Williams defeats Dinara Safina, 6–0, 6–3
French Open
 Men's final: Roger Federer defeats Robin Söderling, 6–1, 7–6(1), 6–4
 Women's final: Svetlana Kuznetsova defeats Dinara Safina, 6–4, 6–2
Wimbledon championships
Men's final: Roger Federer defeats Andy Roddick, 5–7, 7–6(6), 7–6(5), 3–6, 16–14
 Women's final: Serena Williams defeats Venus Williams, 7–6(3), 6–2
U.S. Open
 Men's final: Juan Martín del Potro defeats Roger Federer, 3–6, 7–6(5), 4–6, 7–6(4), 6–2
 Women's final: Kim Clijsters defeats Caroline Wozniacki, 7–5, 6–3
Davis Cup
  defeats , 5–0
Fed Cup
  defeats , 4–0

Water polo
 Men's water polo World Championship 2009 : Serbia

Multi-sport events
 August 3 – 9 – 2009 World Waterski Championships in Calgary, Alberta, Canada.
 July 11 – 19 – 2009 Lusophony Games in Lisbon, Portugal.
 July 16 – 26 – World Games 2009 in Kaohsiung, Taiwan.
 Chinese delegation boycotts the opening ceremony on July 16.
 2009 Summer Deaflympics is held in Taipei, Taiwan
 December 5(some events will start from December 2)—December 13 – 2009 East Asian Games in Hong Kong, China
 December 9 – December 18 – 2009 Southeast Asian Games in Vientiane, Laos

References

 
Sports by year